Elvis Taione (born 25 May 1983 in Nukualofa, Tonga) is a rugby union footballer. His regular playing position is hooker. He previously played Super Rugby for the Western Force,  Waratahs, Jersey in the RFU Championship and is currently signed to Exeter Chiefs, winning the Aviva Premiership in 2016/17.

Exeter Chiefs signed Taione in March 2014 on a two-year contract. He was named in Tonga's 2015 Rugby World Cup squad.

On 15 June 2021, after seven season with Exeter, Taione would leave to join Welsh region Ospreys in the United Rugby Championship for the 2021–22 season.

References

External links
Western Force profile
itsrugby.co.uk profile

Living people
1983 births
Tongan rugby union players
Rugby union hookers
Western Force players
New South Wales Waratahs players
Jersey Reds players
Exeter Chiefs players
Tongan expatriate rugby union players
Expatriate rugby union players in Australia
Expatriate rugby union players in England
Tongan expatriate sportspeople in Australia
Tongan expatriate sportspeople in England
People from Nukuʻalofa
Tonga international rugby union players
Ospreys (rugby union) players
Tongan expatriate sportspeople in Wales